Johann Heinrich Sulzer (18 September 1735, Winterthur – 14 August 1813, Winterthur) was a Swiss physician and entomologist.

He studied medicine at the University of Tübingen and later started a medical practice in Winterthur. As a physician he distinguished himself in his work with smallpox vaccinations. In the field of entomology, he was the author of: 
 Die Kennzeichen der Insekten, nach Anleitung des Königl. Schwed. Ritters und Leibarzts Karl Linnaeus, (...) (1761) – The characteristics of insects, according to the instructions of Carl Linnaeus.
 Abgekürzte Geschichte der Insecten nach dern Linaeischen System (1776) – Abbreviated history of insects according to the Linnaean System.

References and external links
BHL Digitised works by Sulzer at Biodiversity Heritage Library.

Swiss entomologists
1735 births
1813 deaths
University of Tübingen alumni
People from Winterthur